Notre Dame Public School, Bettiah (often called NDPS or Notre Dame) is a co-educational day and boarding public school located in the Belbagh area of Bettiah city of Bihar, India.

Origins 
Notre Dame Public School, Bettiah, a CBSE affiliated school, was founded by Dr. A.K Sinha.

References

External links
 
 ICBSE page

Boarding schools in Bihar
High schools and secondary schools in Bihar
Private schools in Bihar
Christian schools in Bihar
West Champaran district
Co-educational schools in India
Educational institutions established in 1993
1993 establishments in Bihar